Valeria Sarmiento (born 29 October 1948) is a film editor, director and screenwriter best known for her work in France, Portugal and her native Chile. She has worked both in film and television, directing 20 feature films, documentaries and television series'. She is the widow of Chilean film director Raúl Ruiz (1941-2011) with whom she collaborated for decades as regular editor and co-writer. She has also edited films for Luc Moullet, Robert Kramer and Ventura Pons and is a Guggenheim Fellow (1988).

Biography
Sarmiento was born in the Chilean municipality of Valparaíso and was first exposed to film at the age of five, becoming familiar with the work of Orson Welles, Alfred Hitchcock and others. She rarely saw French films due to censorship but, thanks to what she refers to as a "moment of magic", was able to watch Jean-Luc Godard's Breathless (1960) at the age of twelve. She went on to study film and philosophy at the University of Valparaíso and married filmmaker Raúl Ruiz in 1969. In 1974, the couple were forced to move to Paris due to the 1973 Chilean coup d'état of Augusto Pinochet.

Sarmiento made her directorial debut with the documentary Un sueño como de colores (1972) about a group of Chilean women dedicated to striptease. Her later work as a director, usually in melodrama, romantic drama and costume drama, has also often featured strong female characters who face machismo and sexism. Her debut feature Notre mariage (1984) was a Grand Prix winner for Best New Director at the San Sebastián International Film Festival, her 1991 film Amelia Lópes O'Neill was entered into the 41st Berlin International Film Festival and her Napoleonic war epic Lines of Wellington competed for the Golden Lion at the 69th Venice International Film Festival.

A symposium on Sarmiento's feminism was held at Stanford University in May 2008  and the Cinémathèque Française ran a Sarmiento retrospective in October 2018.

Filmography

References

Bibliography
 Bruno Cuneo and Fernando Pérez V. (eds.) Una mirada oblicua. El cine de Valeria Sarmiento (Universidad Alberto Hurtado, 2021) 
 Elizabeth Ramírez and Catalina Donoso (eds.) Nomadías. El cine de Marilú Mallet, Valeria Sarmiento y Angelina Vásquez (Ediciones Metales Pesados, 2016) ,

External links

MUBI's Sarmiento page
2012 cineuropa interview
2018 Film Comment interview

1948 births
Living people
Chilean film directors
Chilean film editors
Chilean screenwriters
People from Valparaíso
Chilean exiles
Chilean expatriates in France
Chilean emigrants to France
Chilean women film directors
Women film editors